Alan William Starling (born 2 April 1951) was a professional footballer, who played as a goalkeeper for Luton Town, Torquay United, Northampton Town & Huddersfield Town.

Playing career
Starling began his career as an apprentice with Luton Town, turning professional in April 1969 and making his league debut the following season. He joined Torquay United on loan in February 1971, playing just once, in a 4–0 defeat at home to Reading in place of regular keeper Andy Donnelly, before returning to Luton.

He moved to Northampton Town in June 1971 and went on to make over 200 appearances for the Cobblers. In April 1976 he scored a penalty in the penultimate game of the season, against Hartlepool United, ensuring that every regular player for Northampton that season has scored at least once. He also holds the record of the most minutes without conceding a goal for Northampton Town when he went 595 minutes unbeaten between 25 October and 29 November 1975. In March 1977 he joined Huddersfield Town.

References

English footballers
English Football League players
Association football goalkeepers
Luton Town F.C. players
Torquay United F.C. players
Northampton Town F.C. players
Huddersfield Town A.F.C. players
1951 births
Living people
Footballers from Dagenham
Place of birth missing (living people)